Tiffany Foster (born 24 July 1984) is a Canadian equestrian who competes in the sport of show jumping.

At the 2012 Summer Olympics in London, Foster was a member of the Canadian team in team jumping but she was disqualified before the final due to hypersensitivity in the front leg of her horse, Victor.

In July 2015 Foster was part of the Gold medal winning team in the Toronto Pan-Am Games.

In July 2016, she was named to Canada's Olympic team.

In 2022 she was the leading Canadian rider at the World Championships in Herning, Denmark. 

Foster is an avid interior decorator in her spare time. She has completed projects across the United States and in Belgium and Canada.

References 

1984 births
Living people
Equestrians at the 2012 Summer Olympics
Equestrians at the 2016 Summer Olympics
Equestrians at the 2015 Pan American Games
Canadian show jumping riders
Olympic equestrians of Canada
Canadian female equestrians
Sportspeople from Vancouver
Pan American Games gold medalists for Canada
Pan American Games medalists in equestrian
Medalists at the 2015 Pan American Games